The Cape Tercentenary Foundation (or Cape 300 Foundation) was set up in 1950 by brothers Edward and Harry Molteno, pioneers of the Cape fruit industry. The influential exporters were great appreciators of music and the arts, and were deeply concerned about the natural environment. They therefore wanted to establish "a fund for the cultural development of Cape Town" as well as for environmental causes.

Projects
The stated mission of the Cape 300 Foundation is to preserve, promote and encourage literature, the visual and performing arts, and the natural and cultural environment in the Cape.

Projects of the Foundation include scholarships and bursaries (especially post-graduate or doctoral), equipment and grants for needy schools and students, public libraries, heritage trusts, publication subsidies, orchestras and music societies, environmental organisations (such as the Botanical Society of South Africa and SANCCOB), educational workshops and other community projects.

Awards
The actions and achievements of individuals or organisations that further the aims and objectives of the Foundation are recognized by awarding the Molteno Medal, which was first struck in 2000 to mark the 50th year of the Foundation and remembers its founders, Edward and Harry Molteno.

Funding
The foundation receives continued support from the Molteno Trust but financial assistance is open to all. Donations to the foundation go to fund projects such as study grants, publication subsidies and the preservation of the built or natural environments.

References

External links
Official website.

Non-profit organisations based in South Africa
Charities based in South Africa
Foundations based in South Africa
Environmental charities
Cape Town culture
South African awards
South African literary awards
South African literary events